Christian David Torres Roldán (born October 23, 1996, in Tulancingo, Hidalgo) is a Mexican professional footballer. He made his professional debut with Tijuana during a Copa MX victory over Necaxa on 21 January 2015.

External links
 
 

1996 births
Living people
Association football defenders
Club Tijuana footballers
Dorados de Sinaloa footballers
Las Vegas Lights FC players
Ascenso MX players
Liga Premier de México players
Tercera División de México players
USL Championship players
Mexican expatriate footballers
Expatriate soccer players in the United States
Mexican expatriate sportspeople in the United States
Footballers from Hidalgo (state)
People from Tulancingo
Mexican footballers